Palvennia is an extinct genus of ophthalmosaurid ichthyosaurian known from the uppermost Jurassic of Central Spitsbergen, Norway. It was named for PalVenn, the Friends of the Palaeontological Museum in Oslo, whose expedition led to the discovery of the type specimen. It is unusual in having a very short rostrum (~0.6× the skull length), similar to Ichthyosaurus breviceps. Because of this, the orbit seems very large (0.34× the skull length), but this may be effected by crushing. The single and only known species is Palvennia hoybergeti Druckenmiller et al., 2012. In 2019, Palvennia was synonymized with Arthropterygius, though maintained as a separate species, by Nikolay Zverkov and Natalya Prilepskaya, although this synonymy was objected to later that same year by Lene Delsett and colleagues, who maintained that they were sufficiently different to warrant separate genera.

See also 
 List of ichthyosaurs
 Timeline of ichthyosaur research

References 

Ophthalmosaurinae
Tithonian life
Late Jurassic ichthyosaurs
Jurassic Norway
Fossils of Svalbard
Agardhfjellet Formation
Fossil taxa described in 2012
Ichthyosauromorph genera